The Punjab Police SWAT Team is an elite commando force and the specialised counter terrorism unit of the Punjab Police.

Overview
Punjab Police Special Weapons and Tactics (SWAT) was formed in 2011. They are usually tasked with protection duties. They are highly trained on the lines of National Security Guard by Israel's Mossad through private company Athena Security, deployed by the Punjab Government. All the commandos are under 28 years of age, thus making them fit and capable of tasks meant for commandos. Their main work is to fight against any terrorist attack if it occurs in Punjab State. They have been trained exclusively in Krav Maga, room intervention, close and open techniques and other secret tactics.

Equipment
The SWAT is provided with:
 Bullet-proof transport
 Light weight bullet-proof jackets and helmets
 Hands-free radio sets 
 Complete anti-trauma body suit with level-2 protection
 Riot control helmet 
 Gas masks
 Shock shields 
 Laser guns
 Gas guns and 
 Pepper gun launcher

Weapons

Glock 17 pistol
Brugger & Thomet MP9 sub machine gun
Heckler & Koch MP5 sub machine gun
MTAR 21 X95 assault rifle
SIG 552 assault rifle
AK-47 assault rifle
IMI Negev LMG
FN Minimi LMG 
Steyr SSG 69 sniper rifle
CornerShot
Night vision device

Major operation
2015 Gurdaspur attack - Punjab SWAT very efficiently handled counter-terrorism operation at Dina Nagar Police Station in 2015 Gurdaspur attack by killing all 3 suspected Lashkar-e-Taiba terrorists.

See also
 Counter Insurgency Force (West Bengal)
 Special Operation Group (Odisha)
 Greyhounds (police)
 Force One (Mumbai Police)
 Special Operations Group (India)

References

Punjab Police (India)
Non-military counterterrorist organizations
Specialist law enforcement agencies of India
2011 establishments in Punjab, India
Government agencies established in 2011